Kjeldsenia is a fungal genus in the family Claustulaceae. It contains the single truffle-like  species Kjeldsenia aureispora, described in 1995 and found in Mendocino County, California. The genus name honors C.K. Kjeldsen, professor of botany at Sonoma State University, while the specific epithet aureispora refers to the color of the spores when they are viewed in transmitted light.

References

External links

Phallales
Environment of California